Ahmad Khairil Anuar bin Ahmad Zamri (born 8 March 1995) is a Malaysian professional footballer who plays for Malaysia Super League club Kelantan as a midfielder.

Club career
Born in Teluk Intan, Khairil started playing football since school and has represented Perak at age 9. He played for Perak youth team before being promoted to the first team in 2015.

International career
On 6 November 2017, Khairil has received a call-up to the Malaysia senior side under head coach Nelo Vingada.

On 13 November 2017, Khairil made his debut for Malaysia national team in a 1–4 defeat to North Korea as a starter before came out at 46th minute and was replaced by Safiq Rahim.

Career statistics

Club

International

Honours

Perak
 Malaysia Super League Runner-up: 2018
 Malaysia Cup: 2018
 Malaysia FA Cup runner-up: 2019

References

External links
 
 

1995 births
Living people
Malaysian footballers
Perak F.C. players
Petaling Jaya City FC players
Sarawak United FC players
Kelantan F.C. players
People from Perak
Malaysia Super League players
Malaysia international footballers
Association football midfielders